The 1995 Peters International was a tennis tournament played on outdoor hard courts at the NSW Tennis Centre in Sydney in Australia that was part of the World Series of the 1995 ATP Tour and of Tier II of the 1995 WTA Tour. The tournament was held from 9 through 15 January 1995.

Finals

Men's singles

 Patrick McEnroe defeated  Richard Fromberg 6–2, 7–6(7–4)
 It was McEnroe's 1st title of the year and the 15th of his career.

Women's singles

 Gabriela Sabatini defeated  Lindsay Davenport 6–3, 6–4
 It was Sabatini's 1st title of the year and the 37th of her career.

Men's doubles

 Todd Woodbridge /  Mark Woodforde defeated  Trevor Kronemann /  David Macpherson 7–6, 6–4
 It was Woodbridge's 1st title of the year and the 28th of his career. It was Woodforde's 1st title of the year and the 33rd of his career.

Women's doubles

 Lindsay Davenport /  Jana Novotná defeated  Patty Fendick /  Mary Joe Fernández 7–5, 2–6, 6–4
 It was Davenport's 1st title of the year and the 6th of her career. It was Novotná's 1st title of the year and the 64th of her career.

References

External links
 ATP – Tournament profile 
 WTA – Tournament profile

 
Peters International, 1995